The 1946 All-Ireland Senior Camogie Championship Final was the fifteenth All-Ireland Final and the deciding match of the 1946 All-Ireland Senior Camogie Championship, an inter-county camogie tournament for the top teams in Ireland.

Antrim's superior speed gave them a four-point win.

References

All-Ireland Senior Camogie Championship Finals
Camogie
1946 in Northern Ireland sport